Entlibühl or Äntebüel, formerly also Koschmannskeller Kopf was a small island in the Untersee, itself part of Lake Constance. It lay around 30 metres off the Swiss shore below  Gottlieben in the Canton of Thurgau. The island is shown on historical maps by the  Swisstopo from 1966 to 1995 off the western boundary of the municipality of Gottlieben with its former neighbour, Triboltingen (1975 incorporated into Ermatingen). From 2003 the name Äntebüel is found on the map in dark blue lettering surrounded by an enclosed isobath, i.e., designating a hydrographical object such as a shallows. A cartometric measurement of the former island gives a length from east to west of 70 metres, a maximum width of 25 metres and an area of around 1,100 square metres or 0.11 hectares.

The name Äntebüel means 'bank in the water on which ducks like to rest'.

The island consisted mainly of sea chalk (Schnegglisand). In a 1911 publication it stated:

References 

Former islands
Islands of Lake Constance in Germany
Geography of Thurgau